Boughner is a surname. Notable people with the surname include:

 Barry Boughner (born 1948), Canadian hockey player
 Bob Boughner (born 1971), Canadian hockey player and coach
 Thelma Boughner (1918–2017), Canadian diver

English-language surnames